The Kingdom movement is the name used by members of the Social Gospel to describe themselves. 

The term "Social Gospel" did not come into common use until the twentieth century. As one historian has said, "In the mid-1890s the most prominent manifestation of what we now call the Social Gospel movement was the Kingdom movement."

Notes

References
 
 

1890s in Christianity
Christian theological movements
Progressive Era in the United States